The men's tournament of the 2013 Canadian Junior Curling Championships was held from January 31 to February 10 at the Suncor Community Leisure Centre at MacDonald Island Park and at the Oilsands Curling Club in Fort McMurray, Alberta.

Competition format
All of the teams will compete in a round robin tournament consisting of two pools of seven teams each. At the conclusion of the preliminary round robin, the top four teams in each pool advance to the championship pool, while the rest of the teams move to the seeding pool. The teams in both the championship and seeding pools will play against the teams from their other pools. At the conclusion of the championship and seeding pools, the win–loss records of both pools will be combined for the final ranking. The top three teams in this ranking advance to the playoffs, where the second- and third-ranked teams will play in the semifinal, and the winner of the semifinal will play the first-ranked team in the final.

Teams
The teams are listed as follows:

Round-robin standings
Final round-robin standings

Round-robin results
All draw times are listed in Mountain Standard Time (UTC−7).

Pool A

Draw 1
Saturday, February 2, 1:00 pm

Draw 2
Saturday, February 2, 6:30 pm

Draw 3
Sunday, February 3, 1:00 pm

Draw 4
Sunday, February 3, 6:00 pm

Draw 6
Monday, February 4, 2:00 pm

Draw 7
Monday, February 4, 7:00 pm

Draw 8
Tuesday, February 5, 1:00 pm

Draw 9
Tuesday, February 5, 6:00 pm

Pool B

Draw 1
Saturday, February 2, 1:00 pm

Draw 2
Saturday, February 2, 6:30 pm

Draw 3
Sunday, February 3, 1:00 pm

Draw 4
Sunday, February 3, 6:00 pm

Draw 5
Monday, February 4, 9:00 am

Draw 6
Monday, February 4, 2:00 pm

Draw 7
Monday, February 4, 7:00 pm

Draw 8
Tuesday, February 5, 1:00 pm

Draw 9
Tuesday, February 5, 6:00 pm

Placement Round

Championship Pool

Standings
Final Standings

Results

Draw 1
Wednesday, February 6, 1:00 pm

Draw 2
Wednesday, February 6, 6:00 pm

Draw 3
Thursday, February 7, 1:00 pm

Draw 4
Thursday, February 7, 6:00 pm

Draw 5
Friday, February 8, 8:00 am

Championship Pool Tiebreaker
Friday, February 8, 1:00 pm

Seeding Pool

Standings

Results

Draw 1
Wednesday, February 6, 1:00 pm

Draw 2
Wednesday, February 6, 6:00 pm

Draw 3
Thursday, February 7, 1:00 pm

Draw 4
Thursday, February 7, 6:00 pm

Draw 6
Friday, February 8, 1:00 pm

Playoffs

Semifinal
Saturday, February 9, 10:30 am

Final
Saturday, February 9, 5:00 pm

Awards
The all-star teams and award winners are as follows:

All-Star Teams
First Team
Skip:  Thomas Scoffin, Alberta
Third:  Colton Lott, Manitoba
Second:  David Easter, Ontario
Lead:  Andrew O'Dell, New Brunswick

Second Team
Skip:  Stuart Thompson, Nova Scotia
Third:  Aaron Squires, Ontario
Second:  Daniel Grant, Manitoba
Lead:  Brendan MacCuish, Manitoba

Ken Watson Sportsmanship Awards
 Landon Bucholz, Alberta second

Fair Play Awards
Lead:  Andrew Taylor, Newfoundland and Labrador
Second:  Sanjay Bowry, British Columbia
Third:  Jamie Airut, Nunavut
Skip:  Will Mahoney, Yukon
Coach:  Benoit Forget, Quebec

ASHAM National Coaching Awards
 Mark Noseworthy, Newfoundland and Labrador

Joan Mead Legacy Awards
 Jonathan Schut, Prince Edward Island lead

References

External links

2013 in Canadian curling
Curling in Alberta
Canadian Junior Curling Championships